The Noise of Engines is a Canadian drama film, directed by Philippe Grégoire and released in 2021. The film stars Robert Naylor as Alexandre, a Canada Border Services Agency instructor who returns to his hometown after being suspended from work following an unverified sexual assault allegation, who befriends Icelandic drag racer Aðalbjörg (Tanja Björk) while under surveillance by the police because of a spate of pornographic graffiti in the town.

The cast also includes Alexandrine Agostini, Marc Beaupré, Arnmundur Ernst Björnsson, Huguette Chevalier, Patrice Dussault, Marie-Thérèse Fortin, Maxime Genois, Vial Grégoire, Ingi Hrafn Hilmarsson, Nadia Kessiby, Marc Larrivée, Gabrielle Lessard, Virginie Ouellet, Naïla Rabel and Charles Voyer.

The film was inspired in part by Grégoire's own background as a Canada Border Services Agency employee, and was shot primarily in Grégoire's hometown of Napierville, Quebec but also partly in Iceland.

The film premiered at the 69th San Sebastián International Film Festival on September 19, 2021. It had its Canadian premiere at the Festival du nouveau cinéma.

Awards

References

External links

2021 films
2021 drama films
Canadian drama films
Films shot in Quebec
Films set in Quebec
Quebec films
French-language Canadian films
2020s Canadian films